The 2011 Power Snooker Masters Trophy was a cue sports tournament  that took place between 19–20 November 2011 at Event City, Trafford Centre, Manchester. Martin Gould beat Ronnie O'Sullivan 286–258 on points in a 30 minute time based unlimited racks final. Gould earned £25,000 as the winner while O'Sullivan received £12,000 as the runner-up. After the event it was revealed that O'Sullivan also received £25,000 appearance money, whereas the other top 16 players were only guaranteed £3,000 in prize money. When asked about this, Neil Robertson said: "If a tournament needs one player for it to happen, [it] shouldn't be on at all...".

Main draw
All times are GMT.

References

Power Snooker Masters Trophy
Power Snooker Masters Trophy
Power Snooker